Domingos de Moraes is a train station on ViaMobilidade Line 8-Diamond, located in the district of Lapa in São Paulo.

There are future plans for it to be connected with a new CPTM line, yet with no color or number defined, which will connect Piqueri with Monte Belo station, in Butantã.

History

The station was opened in 1920, named Posto Telegráfico Km 9,221. In 1921, it was renamed to Domingos de Moraes as a tribute to the Brazilian politician, who was Vice President (now Vice Governor) of São Paulo in 1902. The telegraph post receive a new building in 1926 and was promoted to station on 1 March 1931.

During the remodeling of the FEPASA West Line (current CPTM Line 8-Diamond), in the end of the 1970s, received another new building, opened on 9 August 1978. FEPASA had promised many news for the station, such as cafeterias, newsstands, public phones and restrooms, but none of them was made. Actually, the station was reopened without lighting in the platforms and ticket gates, the ticket offices were working in an improvised location with wood fences, and there was a great gap in the platforms, projected to receive the French trains, which started operating in 1979.

To contain the income evasion, FEPASA also predicted to build concrete walls through all the line extension, with  gaps between each block, where flower gardens would be made.

Since 1996, it belongs to CPTM. Besides the name of the politician is currently spelled "Domingos de Morais", the company preferred to keep the original spelling as "Moraes".

In 2014, the station was remodernized. Among the improvements, there were accessibility works, which include elevators to access the platforms, new visual communication - with Braille options -, customer service room in the platform and common and adapted public restrooms.

References

Companhia Paulista de Trens Metropolitanos stations
Railway stations opened in 1931